Jensen P66 was a model range planned by Jensen Motors in the 1960s, which was aborted after two examples were made and one was exhibited at the 1965 London Motor Show.

It was planned as a replacement for the Austin-Healey 3000, which at that time Jensen were assembling at their factory in West Bromwich. BMC were planning to drop the Healey and Jensen asked Eric Neale, their house stylist, to design a replacement for the US market. In a break from their recent tradition of using glassfibre, he used an aluminium body on a steel platform and tube chassis. The optional engine continued to be a 6.2 litre Chrysler V8 similar to that used in the contemporary CV8, or a 4.5 litre in stock form.  The car was priced at £2,200 in the UK against £3,500 for the CV8, and would possibly have been renamed as Interceptor if put into production.

Reception to the convertible car was generally favourable, although the strakes over the wheel arch were criticised in the press as outdated.  A hardtop version was also produced with plain wheel arches. The company founders, Richard and Alan Jensen, favoured putting the model into production. The Norcros group had been controlling the company for some years and preferred to adopt an Italian styled body, a view shared by Managing Director Brian Owen and Deputy Chief Engineer Kevin Beattie.  They approached Touring of Milan who produced a rival design that was put into production by Vignale as the Interceptor.

After making some changes to the Touring design to make it suitable for tooling, Eric Neale felt that he had no role left in the company and resigned. He was followed by the Jensen brothers.

The convertible P66 was soon broken up, the parts and the other hardtop model being sold on. The second, hardtop, model has survived in original condition and has been used regularly; following a thorough rebuild it won Car of the Show in the 'Classic & Sports Car' Club Awards at the 2015 Lancaster Insurance Classic Motor Show.

References

Notes

Bibliography
 "Jensen" by Keith Anderson  ISBN number 0-85429-682-4   Foulis Motoring / Haynes book 1989
 "Jensen & Jensen-Healey" by Keith Anderson ISBN number 0-7509-1808-X  Sutton

External links
 Jensen Owners' Club
 P66 Owner's Website

P66